Andreu Lacondeguy is a Freeride Mountain biker and Freestyle motocross athlete from Barcelona, Catalonia, Spain, born 12 January 1989. He is a 2013 Munich X-Games bronze medalist in the Mountain Bike Slopestyle event and a Red Bull Rampage Winner in 2014.

Personal
Andreu Lacondeguy grew up in Montseny, near Barcelona, and began Four-Cross racing at the age of 10 and became regional champion; he then moved to BMX and downhill mountain biking racing, and won a contract with Team Maxxis when he was 15. He and his brother Lluís, who is also a professional mountain bike racer, hone their skills in California. Andreau has also competed in Freestyle Motocross himself and often takes his FMX experience and tricks to the Freeride Mountain Bike world.

He has "Love Dirt" tattooed on his fingers.

Career
In 2008 he won Crankworx Whistler and also became one of the first to land a double backflip on a mountain bike in competition; he was the first to land a backflip from a snow-covered big air ramp. In 2012 he won the Red Bull Berg Line event in Winterberg, In 2013 Lacondeguy earned a Bronze medal in the Munich X-Games Slopestyle event, and in 2014 he won the Red Bull Rampage. He came second in 2015 and 2018. He also placed Fourth in 2010, 2012, and 2013, just shy of the podium.

In 2015, he and Kurt Sorge, Graham Aggasiz, Nico Vink, Makken Haugen and Nick Pescetto launched the Fest series of one-week invitational Freeride meets at locations all around the world.

In 2013, Farm Jam Festival he would win the MTB "Dirt Jam" contest. He, would compete in both the FMX and BMX Dirt contest; being the first to ever compete in all three events.

References

External links

Living people
Cyclists from Barcelona
1989 births
Sportspeople from Barcelona
Spanish male cyclists
Freeride mountain bikers
Freestyle motocross riders